Produce 101 was a Chinese reality show, which premiered on Tencent Video and based on the South Korean franchise show of the same name. The first season premiered on April 21, 2018 and aimed to form an eleven-member girl group.

The series is jointly produced by 7-D Vision and Tencent Penguin Pictures, under license from Mnet's owner CJ E&M. The show attracted more than 4.3 billion views on Tencent Video.

Background
Since the success of Super Girl in China, there has yet to have been a national show that has sparked as strong interest from audiences in the same manner. Subsequently, while the show launched the careers of many talented solo vocalists, there has been a lack of girl groups in the Chinese speaking world. The biggest girl group in the early 2000s was S.H.E and since then, there has arguably been a lack of well-known cohesive girl groups that have been as successful. The show aims to create a brand new "it" girl group that represents modern women and appeals to all genders for the new generation.

Unlike the original Korean version, Produce 101 China has a number of different rules and challenges introduced beginning in episode 2. One such example is the inclusion of “knock-out” challengers who can take the place of a 101 member in the original “auditions” based on mentors discretion of the challengers’ skills in comparison to the original trainees. In the first elimination, certain members who had highest votes could also choose to save a member who was up for elimination as a second chance “intern.”

Mentors

Episodes

Episode 1 (April 21, 2018) 
The audience is introduced to the Lady Bee trio who walks in to a dark studio wondering where to go. The lights suddenly turn on and 101 seats are shown. Similar to the Korean counterpart, contestants are introduced by label and choose where they want to sit from #1 to #101. Once every girl is seated, the studio darkens and Tao introduces the mentors with each of the mentors performing their own song. After the performances by the mentors have ended, contestants perform with their label mates or a pre-made group to be evaluated from grades A to F. During the episode, it is revealed that only 11 trainees are only to be sorted into the A group, once 11 girls are filled, another girl that has been given the A rank will have to take a girl's nominated seat, voluntarily if a girl in the top 11 chooses to downgrade to the B rank or through a battle. At the end of the episode, we see 11 spots filled yet Yamy is given an A rank. The mentors discuss heavily to choose whom to demote to B rank. They choose Qiang Dongyue and she agrees to a battle with Yamy. Yamy wins the battle and Qiang Dongyue is reluctantly demoted to the B rank.

Episode 2 (April 28, 2018) 
The evaluations go on where former SNH48 member Ge Jiahui performs with her group and trainees continually get evaluated to their respective ranks. There is a twist after all 101 girls are graded when the mentors announce that girls who are not from idol companies will also be competing for a spot in the top 101. If any of them get above an F grade, they may take the spot of another girl in F grade, eliminating her from the competition. Gao Yingxi, Wu Qianying and Re Yina take Cindy, Dora and Zhao Ling's place on the show. Re Yina also receives an A grade and battles Li Ziting for her spot in A class. Re Yina wins. Sunnee questions the mentors on this decision and Tao responds saying Re Yina's style is more unique and Li Ziting went off key during the vocal part of the battle while Ye Rina did not. Tao reassures the trainees that if they felt they were placed in an incorrect grade if they work hard it will be seen.
The girls arrive at their dorms and all the trainees envy A class' rooms being pink and bigger than all the others and having its own couch. Yina and Sunnee are placed in the same room which causes some tension between them. 
During the first class, it is revealed that Abby left the competition overnight and one of the girls from the non-idol companies, Wang Ju, will be taking her place in C class. The F class girls walk into their small practice room and become emotional at seeing an easel with motivational writing on it in the middle of the room. All of them make a promise to move up. In A class, Re Yina has a hard time matching the tones of the vocal teacher and keeping up with the dance. Li Zixuan in B class gets called up to sing with Ella and begins to cry. Ella motivates her and gets her some sunglasses to cover her eyes to overcome her fear of singing in front of people. 
For the first evaluation, it is revealed that the girls will come up five at a time and dance and sing the theme song in front of everyone. Yang Chaoyue performs poorly and cries afterwards due to embarrassment and stress. When Zhu Tiantian performs, she dances incorrectly and sings loudly and incorrectly, throwing off the other contestants dancing with her. This causes Gao Qiuzi to cry from the shock and stress. The other trainees accuse Zhu Tiantian of just wanting screen time and not caring if it affects other trainees in their individual interviews.
When it comes to F class's turn to be re-graded, Show Luo surprises them by saying only one trainee has remained in F class and the rest have moved up. A class has their re-gradings read out in front of everyone. The biggest change is Re Yina going from A class to F class.

Episode 3 (May 5, 2018) 
The next mission is revealed to be a battle mission like the other 101 series. However, this time the 16 leaders and centres are already chosen and split into two types of eight each. Eight "Skilled" centres and eight "Diligent" centres. The "Diligent" centres are chosen from the eight girls who spent the most time practising while the eight "Skilled" centres are chosen by the mentors and restricted to A and B class. The rest of the girls choose whose team they want to be in by standing behind them. The battles are also not two teams performing the same songs, instead, the centres of each team pick the song they want from a list of 16 songs given to them. On the night of the performances, the mentors form two teams representing eight groups each. The mentors play black and white match to decide who will announce their first group first.
At the end of all of the performances, both teams are left at four points each. As such, the result of the team battle is decided by who received the most votes out of everyone who performed. The person with the most votes was Meng Meiqi, meaning that Zhang Jie and Show Luo's team won the battle.

Episode 4 (May 13, 2018) 
The girls walk into the room and figure out that only the top 55 will remain in the competition. The rankings are announced and it is revealed that their rank will determine their grade from that point on with ranks 55-41 becoming D class, ranks 40-26 becoming C class, ranks 25-12 becoming B class and ranks 11-1 becoming A class. Wu Xuanyi comes 1st and Yang Bing comes 55th. It is then revealed that the eight girls from the winning teams who gained the most votes in the public performances can each pick one member from their teams from the previous round who is not in the top 55 to avoid elimination and join the top 55 as a pending trainee. Tao explains that the pending trainees will not be able to make any choices in the next mission and the 3 pending trainees who get the most votes will stay in the competition. Meng Meiqi saves Jiang Shen (rank 59), Qiang Dongyue saves Luo Tianshu (rank 92), Duan Aojuan saves Liu Nian (rank 63), Sunnee's whole team entered the top 55 without being saved so Sunnee cannot save anyone, Zhao Yaoke saves Yang Han (rank 93), Yamy saves Wang Ju (rank 90), Kimberley saves Chen Yuyan (rank 82) and Yang Chaoyue saves Xu Shiyin (rank 75).

Episode 5 (May 19, 2018) 
The episode starts with the girls calling their families before the first elimination. The procedure for the second mission is revealed. There are six mentors that will hold three different classes; vocal (Ella and Zhang Jie), dance (Show Luo and Wang Yibo) and composition (Hu Yanbin and Lin Yoga). The girls will write down which class they want from most to least (1 being top pick, 3 being bottom pick). The mentors then look through the lists and pick which girls they want. If there are too many top picks for their class, they must choose which girls not to pick and if they do not have enough top picks they must choose some girls who did not pick that class as their top pick. There are 10 spots in composition, 19 spots in vocal and 31 spots in dance. The classes are then split into 12 groups; 2 in composition, 4 in vocal and 6 in dance. The team leaders for all 12 teams are picked from the highest ranked girls within that class. The leaders pick which girls they want to fill their team. The girls race for the song they want by relay, the boards with the song names are on a wall and they have to try to take the board they want. During the race for the dance team's songs, one of the girls falls and all the other girls keep running. This makes Tao very angry and he scolds the girls for many things including their actions during the elimination, talking during filming, not listening and not caring when the girl fell over. The dance teams are made to run again. All the teams then practice for their performance.

Episode 6 (May 26, 2018) 
The teams perform their stages with Meng Meiqi's group going first as she received the most votes on the last stage. It is noticed that there is a chair on the left-hand side of the stage, the chair is revealed to be for the overall popularity queen during the position battle stages. Meng Meiqi is the first popularity queen as her team goes first and she received the most votes within her team. It is explained that if another team's popularity queen receives more votes than her, they can dethrone her. It is also explained that the popularity queens in each team will also get to choose which group to perform next regardless of dethroning the current overall popularity queen or not. The team chosen to perform next is always chosen by the previous team's popularity queen. Meng Meiqi is dethroned by Li Ziting, and Li Ziting is dethroned by Lu Xiaoyu on the last performance, who then becomes the overall popularity queen. The seven pending trainees gather on stage for a voting round to see who will stay and who will be eliminated officially. Jiang Shen, Wang Ju and Liu Nian become normal trainees again.

Episode 7 (June 2, 2018) 
The episode starts with the girls lounging around in their dorms. They get an irregular announcement from Tao where he expresses his sorrow that the next time they meet, some of the girls will be leaving. He also announces and the staff have organised an activity for the girls and each dorm is given a set amount of money. The girls may go out and spend the money on decorations for their dorm room. The dorms will be judged and the winning dorm will win a surprise. The popularity award prize is a voucher to go out and watch a movie, the prize for the best design is a cute dollhouse of the dorm. Meng Meiqi, Yamy, Qiang Dongyue and Sunnee's team wins the best design award and Wang Qing, Gao Quizi, Xu Mengjie and Ma Xingyu's dorm wins the popularity award. The ranks are announced company by company with JC Universe Entertainment being announced first as they are the only group with all of their members currently in the competition. After the rankings, the top 36 girls have a special segment called "Us, whom you did not know" where the girls get to show off skills previously unknown to the public. Then Tao reveals the next mission which, like the other seasons, is the album missions. There are six songs. The centres are chosen by the fans from the girls who received the most votes for each song. The centres are Meng Meiqi (I Am That Kind Of Girl), Wu Xuanyi (Shiny), Yamy (Someone Else's Kid), Yang Chaoyue (Living Up To Our Youth), Zhang Zining (Tears Of A Ferris Wheel) and Lai Meiyun (Awesome). Tao then announces that there will be six male idol seniors joining in the performances, one in each team. Each of them has left a secret message for the girls to try and guess who they are. The episode ends after the first secret message is played.

Episode 8 (June 9, 2018) 
The 36 girls are presented with 30 gifts on a table. Each of the 30 gifts somehow represents one of the six male idols that will join the teams.  Everyone except the centres can pick a gift. The male idols are already assigned to a group so the gift the trainee picks determines which group they will join. Before the girls pick their gifts, the secret messages from each idol are played. The idols, which songs they picked and their gifts are revealed and the teams are formed. The group perform their songs and are then all invited back onstage so the fans can vote for their favourite team, the team that wins will receive a special coaching class from all of the mentors. I Am That Kind Of Girl wins the prize and Zining is crowned overall popularity queen.

Episode 9 (June 16, 2018) 

In this episode, the elimination instead, took place on a cruise unlike the past few rounds. From there, 14 of them were eliminated, leaving only 22 contestants who will be participating in the finals. The girls were then asked to choose between the songs "Bye Bye Baby" (Wang Ju, Wu Xuanyi, Yamy, Duan Aojuan, Lai Meiyun, Gao Qiuzi, Sunnee, Fu Jing, Liu Renyu, Li Zixuan, Angela Hui) and "Full Bloom" (Meng Meiqi, Li Ziting, Yang Chaoyue, Zi Ning, Gao Yingxi, Qi Yandi, Xu Mengjie, Lu Xiaoyu, Wu Yingxiang, Qiang Dongyue, Chen Yihan).

Episode 10 (June 23, 2018) 

This episode begins with all 101 contestants dancing to the theme song "Produce 101 Girls" (Pick Me). The girls then performed either a "vocal" or "dance" performance individually and at the end of everyone's solo performance, performed as a group in their respective divisions. The episode thereafter cuts to the girls performing "Against Odds", followed by "Full Bloom" accordingly to their groups assigned in Episode 9. By the end of the episode, the rankings were announced and Meng Meiqi (with a vote count of 185,244,357), was crowned first place and center of the group, with Wu Xuanyi at second (with a vote count of 181,533,349). It was also revealed that the debuting group will be called "Rocket Girls 101". With that, the show ended with the newly formed group performing to their debut song "Rocket Girls".

Contestants

Color key

Ranking

Top 11

Aftermath 
Rocket Girls 101 debuted on 23 June 2018 right after eleven members were announced. They disbanded on 23 June 2020.

Su Ruiqi (25th), Liu Nian (42nd), Lin Junyi (77th), and Blair (80th) participated in Produce Camp 2020. Blair was eliminated in episode 9 after being ranked 17th. The rest were eliminated in the finale after Lin Junyi being ranked 10th, Su Ruiqi ranked 11th and Liu Nian ranked 12th.
Gou Xueying (48th) and Zhang Chuhan (55th) participated in Youth With You Season 2. Xueying was eliminated in Episode 16 after being ranked 48th and Chuhan was also eliminated in Episode 20 after being ranked 27th. 
Mena (52nd) has moved to South Korea and is now in S2 Entertainment's first group, Hot Issue, under her stage name, Mayna.
Su Ruiqi (25th) participated in Girls Planet 999 and was eliminated in the finale after ranking 13th.

Franchise

References

External links
Weibo
Trainee profiles

Chinese reality television series
Produce 101
2018 Chinese television series debuts
Chinese television series based on South Korean television series
Tencent original programming
Mandarin-language television shows
2018 Chinese television series endings
2018 in Chinese music